ProSieben Fun is a pay-TV channel from ProSiebenSat.1 Media that was launched on 3 May 2012.

The channel targets 14-39 year olds. ProSieben Fun shows repeats of ProSieben and Sat.1 shows, plus exclusive premieres (including Germany's Next Top Model), movies, series, sport, and music events.

Distribution
The channel is broadcast as a simulcast and can be received via Telekom Entertain as well as Kabel Deutschland, Unitymedia, UPC Switzerland and Magine TV.

Until 1 July 2016, the channel was also available via Sky Deutschland.  On 18 May 2016 ProSiebenSat.1 Media announced that it would cease broadcasting on the Sky platform as of 30 June 2016 due to "different strategic orientations".

The channel was available in Austria until the end of June 2016.

Programming

1600 Penn (2014–present)
24: Legacy (2017–present)
Accidentally on Purpose (Aus Versehen glücklich) (2013–present)
American Horror Story (2014–present)
American Housewife (2017–present)
Archer (2017–present)
Baskets (2018–present)
Beauty and the Beast (2014–present)
Being Human (2014–present)
Black Sails (2014–present)
Cooper Barrett's Guide to Surviving Life (2018–present)
Chuck (2012-2016)
Crazy Ex-Girlfriend (2016–present)
Damien (2017–present)
Deadbeat (2015–present)
Dimension 404 (2018–present)
Empire (2015–2017)
Eureka (EUReKA - Die geheime Stadt) (2012–2014, 2016-2017)
Gang Related (2017–present)
Germany's Next Topmodel (2012–present)
Golan the Insatiable (2018–present)
Gotham (2015–present)
Hamish and Andy's Gap Year (seasons 2-4) (2015–present)
It's Always Sunny in Philadelphia (2013-2015)
Jeff Ross Presents Roast Battle (2018–present)
Last Man Standing (2015–present)
Limitless (2016–present)
Lip Sync Battle (Lip Sync Battle - mit LL Cool J) (2016–present)
Lucas Bros. Moving Co. (2018–present)
Minority Report (2016-2017)
Plebs (2016–present)
Quantico (2016–present)
Saturday Night Live (2012–present)
Scorpion (2015–present)
Scream Queens (2017)
Second Chance (2018)
Sex & Drugs & Rock & Roll (2018–present)
Sleepy Hollow (2018–present)
Speechless (2017–present)
Son of Zorn (2018–present)
Star (2017–present)
Supergirl (2016–present)
Terra Nova (2012-2015)
The Almost Impossible Gameshow (2017–present)
The Big Bang Theory (2014–present)
The Exorcist (2017–present)
The Flash (2015–present)
The Grinder (2017–present)
The Inbetweeners (2016–present)
The Last Man on Earth (2017–present)
The Late Late Show with James Corden (2017–present)
The New Normal (2014–present)
The Royals (2015-2016)
The Strain (2017–present)
The Unusuals (2015)
The Vampire Diaries (Vampire Diaries) (2013–present)
Touch (2015, 2017–present)
Vikings (2014–present)
Weeds (Weeds - Kleine Deals unter Nachbarn) (2012-2014)
You're the Worst (2016-2017)
WWE NXT

References

External links
 

Television stations in Germany
Television stations in Switzerland
German-language television stations
Television channels and stations established in 2012
2012 establishments in Germany
ProSiebenSat.1 Media
Mass media in Munich